Lea Weingarten Fastow is a former Enron assistant treasurer who pleaded guilty to tax evasion and filing fraudulent Income Tax returns. The wife of former Enron executive and convicted felon Andrew Fastow, she was the second former Enron executive to go to prison after Enron collapsed due to fraud in December 2001. 

Fastow is a native of Houston, Texas, where she was born into a Jewish family. Her mother was Miriam Hadar Weingarten, winner of the Miss Israel competition in 1958, and her father was Jack Weingarten, of the Weingarten's supermarket chain, who was a real-estate broker. When she was young her parents divorced and her mother went on to marry to Akiva Nof, and from this marriage was born a half-sister. She graduated from Tufts University, where she met her future husband, and earned an MBA at Northwestern University. She and her husband both attended Congregation Or Ami, a conservative synagogue.

In 2003, Fastow was indicted by a federal grand jury for conspiracy to commit wire fraud; money laundering conspiracy and four counts of filing false income tax returns. She pleaded guilty on January 14, 2004, to submitting a fraudulent income tax return that did not include profits her family had received from her husband's off-the-books partnerships.

Fastow reported to prison on July 12, 2004, and was released to a halfway house on July 11, 2005.

References 

 "Lea Fastow arrives early for prison". USA Today. Reuters. July 12, 2004.
 United States v. Lea W. Fastow
Business: Crime paid, and here's what they'll pay back

1961 births
Living people
American energy industry executives
Enron people
Kellogg School of Management alumni
People from Houston
Tufts University alumni
American people convicted of tax crimes
American women business executives
American women company founders
American people of Israeli descent
21st-century American women